Little Company of Mary Hospital is a hospital in San Pedro, California, USA.  The hospital was founded in 1909 by Mrs. Lillian B. Mullen, a graduate nurse and physician from New York. The hospital began in the old Clarence Hotel. The first building constructed for the hospital was located on Sixth St. and was dedicated in 1925. Throughout its history, the hospital has been through numerous remodeling and construction projects and several name changes. The hospital aligned with the Sisters of the Little Company of Mary in the early 1990s. The affiliation with the Sisters of Providence took place in 1998 and the hospital (now medical center) is currently a part of Providence Health & Services.

See also
Little Company of Mary Hospital (Torrance)

External links 
Little Company of Mary Hospital Official Website
This hospital in the CA Healthcare Atlas A project by OSHPD

Hospital buildings completed in 1925
Hospitals in Los Angeles
Providence Health & Services
San Pedro, Los Angeles